Mogens Frey Jensen (born 2 July 1941) is a retired Danish amateur cyclist who competed successfully both on the road and on track. He won, along with Gunnar Asmussen, Per Lyngemark and Reno Olsen, a gold medal at the 1968 Summer Olympics in the 4 km team pursuit and finished second individually. However, he is more famous for the way he won stage 9 in the 1970 Tour de France.  Here, he defeated his own team captain Joaquim Agostinho. Agostinho was first over the finish line, but was immediately disqualified for putting his hand on Frey's handlebars, thus holding him back in the sprint. It was the only Danish Tour de France stage win until 1983.

Frey also won the individual pursuit event at the 1968 world championships and finished second in 1967 behind Gert Bongers.

Major results

1968
1968 Summer Olympics:
 Team Track Pursuit (with Per Lyngemark, Reno Olsen and Gunnar Asmussen)
 Track Pursuit
 World Amateur Track Pursuit Champion
1969
GP ZTS Dubnica nad Vahom
 World Amateur Track Pursuit Champion
1970
Tour de France:
Winner stage 9

References

External links 

Official Tour de France results for Mogens Frey
Jean de Gribaldy and 1970 Frimatic team

1941 births
Living people
Danish male cyclists
Danish Tour de France stage winners
Olympic cyclists of Denmark
Cyclists at the 1968 Summer Olympics
Olympic gold medalists for Denmark
Olympic silver medalists for Denmark
UCI Track Cycling World Champions (men)
Olympic medalists in cycling
People from Glostrup Municipality
Medalists at the 1968 Summer Olympics
21st-century Danish politicians
Danish track cyclists